James Robert Stone (born April 26, 1992) is a former American football center. He played college football at Tennessee. He has also been a member of the Atlanta Falcons, Tampa Bay Buccaneers, and Oakland Raiders.

Early years
Stone played high school football for the Maplewood High School in Nashville, Tennessee. He was the Tennessee AA Lineman of the Year and named to the Tennessee Sports Writers All-State first-team. He competed in the 2010 Under Armour All-America Game.

College career
Stone played from 2010 to 2013 for the Tennessee Volunteers under head coaches Derek Dooley and Butch Jones.

Professional career

Stone was rated the 10th best center in the 2014 NFL Draft by NFLDraftScout.com.

Atlanta Falcons
Stone signed with the Atlanta Falcons on May 10, 2014 after going undrafted in the 2014 NFL Draft.  He made his NFL debut on October 5, 2014 against the New York Giants. In the 2014 season, Stone was in 12 games, starting nine at center. On November 30, 2014, Stone's offense recorded 500 total yards versus the Arizona Cardinals. On December 8, 2014, Stone's offense recorded 465 total yards against the Green Bay Packers. Stone blocked for an offense that was 8th in the NFL in total offense with 378.2 yards per game. That same offense was 5th in passing yards per game with 284.6 yards a game.

On October 11, 2015, Stone filled in at center for an injured Mike Person, the offense gained a season-high 418 total yards, including 176 yards on the ground against the Washington Redskins. On October 15, 2015, Stone made his first start of the season, the offense gained 413 total yards, including 150 rushing yards against the New Orleans Saints. On December 18, 2015, Stone was placed on injured reserve with a knee injury. He was released by the Falcons with an injury settlement on July 19, 2016.

Tampa Bay Buccaneers
On January 20, 2017, Stone signed a reserve/future contract with the Tampa Bay Buccaneers. He was waived on September 2, 2017.

Oakland Raiders
On September 4, 2017, Stone was signed to the Oakland Raiders' practice squad. He was promoted to the active roster on December 20, 2017.

On September 1, 2018, Stone was released by the Raiders.

Chicago Bears
On September 3, 2018, Stone was signed to the Chicago Bears' practice squad. He was released on November 17, 2018.

Stone was suspended for the first three weeks of the 2019 NFL season, and was reinstated from suspension on September 24, 2019.

References

External links

Living people
1992 births
Players of American football from Nashville, Tennessee
American football centers
African-American players of American football
Under Armour All-American football players
Tennessee Volunteers football players
Atlanta Falcons players
Tampa Bay Buccaneers players
Oakland Raiders players
Chicago Bears players
21st-century African-American sportspeople